CSS Tacony was originally a bark captured by the Confederate cruiser CSS Clarence during the American Civil War and converted into a Confederate cruiser for commerce raiding.

The CSS Clarence, commanded by Lt. Charles W. Read, captured the Tacony on June 12, 1863, and since it was a better ship suited for commerce raiding, the crew and armaments were transferred to it and the Clarence was destroyed.

In its brief career as a Confederate cruiser, it captured several ships: The Whistling Ada, Arabella, Byzantium, Elizabeth Ann, Florence, Goodspeed, Isaac Webb, Z.A. Macomber, Marengo, Ripple, Rufus Choate, Shattemuc, Umpire, and Wanderer. Its final capture was the schooner Archer on June 25, 1863, which is a better ship suited for commerce raiding, the crew and armaments were transferred to it and the Tacony was destroyed.

Officers and crew
 Lt. Charles W. Read, commander.
 Billups, Matthewson, and Pride, master's mates.
 Brown, engineer.
 16 men.

Notes and references

 

Tacony
Shipwrecks of the American Civil War
Maritime incidents in June 1863